A World Between is a novel by Norman Spinrad published in 1979.

Plot summary
A World Between is a novel which takes place on a planet called Pacifica, whose governmental system is a media democracy, in which elections are held on a world-wide computer net.

Reception
Greg Costikyan reviewed A World Between in Ares Magazine #1. Costikyan commented that "In Spinrad's firm hands, the result is a gripping story from start to finish. His portrayal of Pacifican society is so convincing that the reader takes for granted its differences from our own, and his depiction of all three sides' propaganda would be like. If Spinrad sometimes succumbs to the urge to preach, what he preaches is democracy, sexual equality, and human understanding; surely, we can forgive him for this."

Reviews
Review by Doug Fratz (1979) in Thrust, #13, Fall 1979
Review by Charles Platt (1980) in Foundation, #18 January 1980

References

1979 American novels
1979 science fiction novels
American science fiction novels
Novels by Norman Spinrad